Cham Kharnub (also Romanized as Cham Kharnūb and Cham-e Kharnūb; also known as Cham-e Kharkāb and Cham Karnub) is a village in Cham Khalaf-e Isa Rural District, Cham Khalaf-e Isa District, Hendijan County, Khuzestan Province, Iran. At the 2006 census, its population was 38, in 9 families.

References 

Populated places in Hendijan County